Martin Redlicki and Jackson Withrow were the defending champions but only Redlicki chose to defend his title, partnering Diego Hidalgo. Redlicki lost in the first round to Nam Ji-sung and Song Min-kyu.

Treat Huey and Nathaniel Lammons won the title after defeating Lloyd Glasspool and Alex Lawson 7–6(7–3), 7–6(7–4) in the final.

Seeds

Draw

References

External links
 Main draw

Columbus Challenger - Doubles
Columbus Challenger